Piopolis is an unincorporated community in Hamilton County, Illinois, United States.

History
Piopolis was settled in 1841 by Roman Catholic immigrants from Baden, Germany. It was known as Auxier Prairie, Dutch Settlement, Mount St. John, St. Francis Xavier, and Belle Prairie before being named Piopolis in 1877 after Pope Pius IX. Piopolis once had a post office, which opened in 1848, and a public school which operated from the 1880s to the 1920s. The community's economy has historically been based on farming.

References

Unincorporated communities in Hamilton County, Illinois
Unincorporated communities in Illinois
Populated places established in 1841
German-American history
1841 establishments in Illinois